Maurice Watkins may refer to:
Maurice Watkins (boxer) (born 1956), former boxer from Houston, Texas
Maurice Watkins (solicitor) (1941 – 2021), British solicitor and sports administrator